Marti Maraden (born June 22, 1945 in El Centro, California) is a Canadian actor and director.
She emigrated to Canada in 1968, and became a leading actor at the Stratford Festival in the 1970s.

She was artistic director of the National Arts Centre English Theatre in Ottawa from 1997 to 2006. While in this position, and arising from her activities in that role, the National Arts Centre co-founded the Magnetic North Theatre Festival.

In 2006 Maraden was appointed to succeed Richard Monette as an artistic director of the Stratford Shakespeare Theatre in Stratford, Ontario. Unlike previous artistic directors at Stratford, Maraden was a member of a three-person artistic team, which included co-directors Des McAnuff and Don Shipley until creative differences forced the three to end their working relationship.

Directed the play Rexy at Neptune Theatre 2015.

References

External links
Maraden's Stratford Festival biography

1945 births
Living people
People from El Centro, California
American emigrants to Canada
Canadian artistic directors